Ed Belfour, a former Manitoba Junior Hockey League star who went on to success in the National Hockey League as one of the most dominant goalies of  his era. A Calder Memorial Trophy winner, a two time Vezina Trophy winner, a three time NHL All-Star, and a Stanley Cup.

Belfour has donated a scholarship to the League in the form of the Ed Belfour High Performance Award for hockey and academic proficiency. The criteria for the award was hockey involvement including statistics, achievements, and team participation; academic achievements including grade point average, awards and classes; community involvement including volunteer work, job and non-school related activities; and finally other school involvement including school sports, committee and clubs. Of course, the winning player must strive to be the best in the Manitoba Junior Hockey league.

Belfour High Performance Award

External links
Manitoba Junior Hockey League

Manitoba Junior Hockey League trophies and awards
Scholarships in Canada